KLB is a pop band from Brazil. The band consists of three brothers from São Paulo: Kiko (Franco Finato Scornavacca), Leandro Finato Scornavacca and Bruno Finato Scornavacca. KLB stands for each brother's name.

Music career
The brothers began their career in 1996, with a group named "The Fenders" and after "Neon" and was composed by the three brothers and the pop singers Wanessa Camargo and Camila, who left the group.

KLB started in 2000 when for the first time, the brothers Kiko, Leandro and Bruno, performed at Anhembi, São Paulo, in an award, contemplating their father Franco Scornavacca, who was receiving the "Best Brazilian Manager of the 90s. Their first single "A Dor Desse Amor" charted #1 in Brazil. 

The KLB phenomenon has one dimension. The group's debut album sold more than 1.5 million copies in less than eight months. There was no mention of anything else. The choruses of the songs were in the mouths of the people, who decorated the lyrics of the successes that would be part of the history of the brothers in the musical environment. In 2002, they renewed their contract with Sony Music label and became one of the first artists to record a DVD. Even with the technology recently arrived in Brazil, this was no obstacle for the sale of more than thirty thousand copies, which joins the incredible numbers of the most talented trio of recent times.
With more than 1,200 registered fan clubs (some of whom had more than 2000 members), Kiko, Leandro and Bruno consolidated their careers based on their moral and professional principles, since they always put the family first. 

The record label sold by the trio has already exceeded 7 million, with one of the CDs selling one million copies.

The band owns a studio in São Paulo, KLB Studios one of the largest recording studios in Brazil and much requested by several artists.

Discography
Studio Albums

Live Albums

EPs

Collected

Singles

As featured artist

Promotional singles

References

External links

Official website 
Biografia

Musical groups established in 2000
Brazilian pop rock music groups
Sibling musical trios
Brazilian musical trios
Musical groups from São Paulo